Guided Missile was a British, London-based, independent record label set up by Paul Kearney in 1994, and active until the early 2000s.

History 
Guided Missile Records focused on releases by underground indie bands through the late 1990s.

A tribute record Orchestral Manoeuvres In The Darkness by Diff'rent Darkness charted at 66 on UK Official Charts Company chart in 2003.

Post history 
Guided Missile continued to at least 2013 as an events promoter, at venues such as The Islington, The Lexington and, until closure, The Buffalo Bar.

Artists
 Bis
 Country Teasers
 God Is My Co-Pilot
 Kling Klang
 Lungleg
 The Male Nurse
 The Yummy Fur

See also
 List of record labels

References

External links
Discogs
45cat

Record labels established in 1994
British independent record labels
Music promoters
Underground punk scene in the United Kingdom